Bacong, officially the Municipality of Bacong,  is a 4th class municipality in the province of Negros Oriental, Philippines. According to the 2020 census, it has a population of 41,207 people.

Bacong was the hometown of the Visayan hero of the Philippine Revolution, Pantaleon Villegas, better known as León Kilat.

History

Bacong was founded 1801 as a coastal settlement. It is the Province's first town south of the Capital. The famed Church of San Agustin de Hippo and its monastery's construction was started in 1866 by Fray Leandro Arrúe Agudo. two years after he became the town's parish priest in 1864 as part of the Augustinian Recollects missionary work. The monastery now serves a retreat house. The stone churchhouse boasts the Province's tallest belfry and oldest main altar, adorned with gold-leafing and painted friezes. Its choir holds a pipe organ from Zaragoza, Spain, installed in 1898 shortly before the revolution against Spain broke out in Negros Oriental. The only other pipe organ of similar provenance is found in Bohol. With its reasonably well-preserved complex including churchyard and convent (ca 1850), the San Agustin of Hippo Church in Bacong is one of the 26 colonial churches all over the country selected for restoration by the National Commission for Culture and the Arts.
Bacong's historical importance is well-monumented: it is the birthplace of Negros Oriental's hero and only Katipunero – General Pantaleon Villegas, aka Leon Kilat, whose birthday is celebrated every July 27. Barrio Isugan was the site of a battle between Filipino and American soldiers.

Beginning the Second World War, Japanese Imperial forces were entered and occupied in Bacong in 1942. Filipino soldiers and guerrillas were encounter by the Japanese Imperial forces start the conflicts from 1942 to 1945 during the occupation. When Allied forces liberated in Bacong was fought against the Japanese Occupation until the end in World War II in 1945. The general headquarters of the Philippine Commonwealth Army and Philippine Constabulary was active in 1945 to 1946 in Bacong during and aftermath in World War II.

Points of touristic interest are a string of beaches the length of the Bacong shoreline, sinamay hand looms, and the Negros Oriental Arts and Heritage (NOAH) which produces export quality stone craft furniture, jewel boxes and fashion accessories.

One of the town's bigger barangays, San Miguel, marks its local fiesta with a unique Sinulog de San Miguel, where the archangel and his heavenly army are depicted battling the forces of evil.

Lawmakers have been proposing to transfer the province's airport from the town of Sibulan to Bacong since 2014, and is still pending final approval as of 2022.

Geography

Barangays
Bacong is politically subdivided into 22 barangays.

Climate

Demographics

Economy

Education
All public schools in the town of Bacong are administered by Bacong District of DepEd Negros Oriental Division.

Public High Schools

Private schools

Elementary schools

References

External links

 [ Philippine Standard Geographic Code]
Philippine Census Information
Local Governance Performance Management System

Municipalities of Negros Oriental